Several styles of the traditional music of Venezuela, such as salsa and merengue, are common to its Caribbean neighbors. Perhaps the most typical Venezuelan music is joropo, a rural form which originated in the llanos, or plains.

Genres

Joropo

Joropo was developed by creative artists such as Juan Vicente Torrealba, Ignacio Figueredo, Augusto Bracca, Genaro Prieto, Eneas Perdomo and Angel Custodio Loyola, who helped to popularize the music throughout the country. Since then a slick, contemporary form of pop-llanera has developed which has earned the scorn of some purists who perceive it as stale and watered-down. Some singers, such as Adilia Castillo, Lorenzo Herrera, Simon Diaz, Mario Suarez, Edith Salcedo, Magdalena Sanchez, Rafael Montaño, Reyna Lucero, Cristina Maica, José Catire Carpio, Cristobal Jimenez, Juan de los Santos Contreras (El Carrao de Palmarito) and Reynaldo Armas have maintained a huge following over the years. In a similar vein, there is also neo-folklore, which takes traditional music and arranges it in an electronic style.

Folk

Another very popular music in Venezuela is the Gaita Zuliana. This genre originated from the region of Zulia State and is very popular during the Christmas season. The gaita united to the Aguinaldo, conforms the national representation of the Venezuelan Christmas. In the east, the malagueña, punto and galerón accompanies the velorios de cruz de mayo, (religious tradition, that is celebrated on 3 May in honor to the Christian cross). In the Venezuelan Andes, the Venezuelan bambuco is a local variation of the bambuco. Other forms include polo and the Venezuelan waltz. The Quinteto Contrapunto, founded by Rafael Suárez and Aida Navarro, was a celebrated Venezuelan vocal quintet which reached nationwide and international celebrity in the early 1960s, and was very active for about a decade.

Other forms of Venezuelan folk music are tensively recorded and researched due to the work of Caracas-based Fundación Bigott. African-derived percussion (including multiple rhythms, such as sangueo, fulia, parranda and tamborera) is perhaps the best documented musical form. Fundacion Bigott has also produced groups such Un Solo Pueblo, Huracán de Fuego and Grupo Madera. These more experimental fusion artists combine rumba, Latin jazz, joropo, salsa, Venezuelan traditional chants and other forms of Latin American music.Then there is also the genre commonly known as "Onda Nueva" (New Wave), which is a combination of joropo and jazz music, with influences from the Brazilian Bossa Nova. The genre was introduced by Aldemaro Romero with a special contribution by famed drummer and timpanist Frank Hernandez, nicknamed "El Pavo" (The Peacock) by employing a very peculiar drum beat. The term was coined by jazz analyst Jacques Braunstein after having been shown a copy of Romero's earliest composition called "Araguita", (originally to be used as jingle material), which Braunstein described as "something of a new wave". Onda Nueva music was heralded as the Venezuelan Bossa Nova with a very particular seal.

Caribbean
Venezuelan calypso music (including Calypso de El Callao), imported from Trinidad in the 1880s by immigrants arriving during a gold rush, has its own distinctive rhythms and lyrical style. Another imported genre is Cuban-American salsa, which has produced several domestic superstars, including Oscar D'Leon. Dominican merengue, Cuban and Colombian Latin pop acts such as Billo's Caracas Boys, the Porfi Jiménez Orchestra and Los Melódicos.

Pop and rock

Pop and rock music are very popular too, and several bands have had considerable success over the years. Venezuelan pop musicians such as Guillermo Davila, Ricardo Montaner, Kiara, Karina, Los Chamos, Urbanda, Uff, José Luis Rodríguez "El Puma", Yordano, Franco DeVita, and Ilan Chester have gained popularity in other Latin American countries. On the other hand, same history for many well-known bands like Devendra Banhart (Naturalismo),  Resistencia, Los Amigos Invisibles (Acid Jazz), Arkangel founded by Paul Gilmann and Freddy Marshall, Malanga, Desorden Publico (Ska/Pop), King Chango (Ska/Latin American music), Culto oculto (Experimental/Rock), Caramelos de Cianuro (Pop/Rock), Mikel Erentxun (Pop/Rock), Candy 66, Tan Frío El Verano, La Vida Bohème and the now extinct but influential groups Sentimiento Muerto (Post-punk), Zapato 3 (Pop/Rock), and Dermis Tatú (Rock).

Electronic music 

In the late 1960s and early 1970s a few Venezuelan artists began experimenting with sounds, using emerging electronic equipment that was being produced. Artists like Vytas Brenner and Grupo C.I.M. used Moog style synthesizers and effects to embrace the shift in new sounds. Alfredo del Mónaco, who founded the Venezuelan branch of ISCM, is considered the pioneer in electronic music in Venezuela having released Estudio electrónico I para cinta in 1968. Jose Enrique Sarabia also known as "Chelique," who was already internationally known for producing songs since the late 50s like "Ansiedad," helped by other gifted musicians, recorded and released a record in 1971 through a private press titled: 4 Fases del Cuatro - Música Venezolana desarrollada Electrónicamente por Chelique Sarabia (4 Phases of Four - Venezuelan Music Electronically Developed by Chelique Sarabia). In 1973, when exclusivity of the private contract ended, Chelique commercially released the record under a different title: Revolución "Electrónica" en Música Venezolana (Electronic Revolution in Venezuelan Music). Revolución "Electrónica" en Música Venezolana is notable for being one of the earliest electronic records in Venezuela and is considered a trailblazing album for electronic music in Latin America.

In the late 1990s a very strong electronic music movement spread through the country. Several big multimedia festivals took place, such as "Caracas No Duerme," "AX," "Petaquire," and "Mare Nostrum." These events combined music with the video and performance art of Venezuelan artists such as Luis Poleo, Frank Wow, and Sony. The main bands/DJ's of this era are Ojo Fatuo, DJ Oddo and DJ Wyz.

From 2000 until present, a lot of Venezuelan artists have made a strong movement into different underground music styles. The most significant ones are: Arca (experimental/industrial) Masseratti 2lts (downtempo), La Vida Boheme (post-punk), Lmca (Electronic/Synthpop/post-punk/experimental), Viniloversus (indie rock), KP-9000 (trip hop), Cardopusher (breakcore), Nuuro (IDM), Patafunk (Tropical/funk), FamasLoop (trip hop/electronica), Todosantos (nu rave/indietronica), Jimmy Flamante (breakbeat), Las Americas (shoegazing), Dondi (drum and bass/downtempo), Retrovértigo (post-rock), Lis (instrumental rock), Tercer Cuarto (alternative metal), Panasuyo (neo-folklore), Pacheko (dubstep), Dame Pa' Matala (reggaeton/hip hop) and Los Javelin (surf rock/rockabilly) AC/Boy (Techno)

Classical music
Venezuela has also produced classical composers such as: Reynaldo Hahn, Teresa Carreño (who was also a world-renowned pianist), Antonio Lauro, Víctor Varela, Antonio Estevez, Evencio Castellanos, Modesta Bor, Prudencio Esaa, Moisés Moleiro, Sylvia Constantinidis, Gustavo Dudamel, Alfredo Rugeles and Eduardo Marturet (who are primarily international conductors), Federico Ruiz (who also works with other genres) and Vicente Emilio Sojo (known for his contributions to Venezuelan musicology and music education). Roberto Ruscitti followed in their footsteps.Venezuela also houses a national network of public conservatories and music schools; there are also private music schools and institutions. Institutes of higher learning that specialize in music or have a music department include Universidad de las Artes, whose music department is the former Instituto Universitario de Estudios Musicales; Universidad Central de Venezuela, which gives diplomas in music performance and postgraduate degrees in musicology, including doctorates; Universidad Simón Bolívar, whose music department awards Master of Music degrees in several areas including composition, conducting, and music education; and Universidad de los Andes. Prominent composers and musicians who have taught, founded, or studied in these institutions include Alberto Grau, Isabel Aretz, María Guinand (who was one of the founders of the Master of Music program of Universidad Simón Bolívar), Diana Arismendi, Ricardo Teruel, Inocente Carreño, Adina Izarra, Marianela Arocha, Maurice Hasson, Pedro Eustache, David Ascanio, Josefina Benedetti, Alfredo del Monaco, Alfredo Rugeles, Humberto Bruni Lamanna, Abraham Abreu, Aldo Abreu, Aquiles Baez, Pablo Gil, Carlos Duarte and Sylvia Constantinidis.

Venezuela also has El Sistema, a publicly financed voluntary sector music education program founded by José Antonio Abreu in 1975. Prominent musicians of El Sistema are Gustavo Dudamel director of Los Angeles Philharmonic, Rodolfo Saglimbeni was appointed Principal Conductor of the National Symphony Orchestra of Chile, José Luis Gomez director of the Tucson Symphony Orchestra, Rafael Payare director of San Diego Symphony, Glenn Garrido director of the Houston Latin American Philharmonic,  and doublebassist Edicson Ruiz who at age 17, became the youngest member of the Berlin Philharmonic Orchestra. The country's symphony orchestras include the Venezuela Symphony Orchestra, Maracaibo Symphony Orchestra, Municipal Symphony Orchestra, Mérida State Symphony Orchestra, and the Orquesta Sinfónica Simón Bolívar.

Composers
Juana Maria de la Concepcion, commonly referred to as Conny Méndez, born 11 April 1898 in Caracas, was a composer, singer, writer, caricaturist and actress who produced more than 40 compositions, such as: Yo soy venezolana, Chucho y Ceferina, La Negrita Marisol, Venezuela Habla Cantando, and many others.

Rubén Cedeño, composer of folk and children's music of Venezuela, he appears in the Venezuelan music encyclopedia. Singer, composer, investigator, painter and writer.

His most recognized works are: The Aguinaldo Que Navidad part of the Venezuelan Christmas repertoire and interpreted by the mezzo-soprano Morella Muñoz, Cantata infantil Simón Bolívar, Misa de mi Tierra among others. It was National Prize of popular music of the INAVI with his valse Nora. The hymn Hail to the Statue of Liberty, received the congratulation of President Ronald Reagan.

Antonio Lauro composed a large body of classical guitar works, adapting traditional Venezuelan waltz and folk songs for the instrument.

Gustavo Matamoros is a renowned Venezuelan composer dedicated to the experimentation with sound and its relationship with the human mind and culture. He has worked mainly with contemporary techniques such as electroacoustics, mixed media, performance, installations, radiophony and multimedia spectacles. He resides in the US. The work of composer, arranger and musical producer Jesús "Chuchito" Sanoja is considered an important part of the Venezuelan cultural patrimony.

Notable musicians and groups
Other Venezuelan performers of note are Chino y Nacho, Franco de Vita, Alirio Diaz, Hernán Gamboa, Gualberto Ibarreto, Enrique Hidalgo, Rudy Regalado, Jesus Sanoja, Otmaro Ruiz, Vytas Brenner, Yordano, Juan Carlos Salazar, Huáscar Barradas, Billo Frómeta, Homero Parra, Gerry Weil, Diego Matheuz, Domingo Hindoyan, Soledad Bravo, Vidal Colmenares, María Teresa Chacín, Luis Gómez-Imbert, Luis Mariano Rivera, Maurice Hasson, Luis Laguna, Arca, Graciela, Italo Pizzolante, Cecilia Todd, Lilia Vera, Renato Capriles, Alí Primera, José Luis Rodríguez, Graciela Naranjo, Mario Carniello,  Henry Martínez, Pedro Eustache and Alberto Naranjo, as well as the groups Serenata Guayanesa, Dimensión Latina, Los Cuñaos, Los Cañoneros, Guaco, Fantasmas de Caribe, Mango, Grupo Madera, Percujazz Ensamble, Ensamble Gurrufio, Lloviznando Cantos, Los Chamos and El Trabuco Venezolano, among others.

See also

Opera in Venezuela
Nueva canción
Alí Primera

References

Citations
 Brill, Mark. Music of Latin America and the Caribbean, 2nd Edition, 2018. Taylor & Francis 
 Peñín, José y Walter Guido. Enciclopedia de la Música en Venezuela, Tomo I. Caracas. Fundación Bigott.  
 Rosenberg, Dan and Phil Sweeney. Salsa con Gasolina. 2000.  In Broughton, Simon and Ellingham, Mark with McConnachie, James and Duane, Orla (Ed.), World Music, Vol. 2: Latin & North America, Caribbean, India, Asia and Pacific, pp 624–630. Rough Guides Ltd, Penguin Books.

External links
  Audio clips: Traditional music of Venezuela. Musée d'ethnographie de Genève. Accessed 25 November 2010.
BBC Radio 3 Audio (60 minutes): Afro-Venezuelan music of the coast. Accessed 25 November 2010.
BBC Radio 3 Audio (60 minutes): Harp playing cowboys of the central plains. Accessed 25 November 2010.
Llanera Music